James E. Brau (born 1946) is an American physicist at the University of Oregon (UO) who conducts research on elementary particles and fields. He founded the Oregon experimental high energy physics group in 1988 and served as director of the UO Center for High Energy Physics from 1997 to 2016. Prior to joining the Oregon faculty, he served in the Air Force and held positions at the Stanford Linear Accelerator Center and the University of Tennessee. He is a fellow of both the American Physical Society and also the American Association for the Advancement of Science. In 2006 he was appointed the Philip H. Knight Professor of Natural Science, an endowed professorship.

Early life and education 
James Edward Brau, son of Rose and James Ernest Brau, was born in 1946 in Tacoma, Washington, in the U.S. He was graduated in 1965 from Lincoln High School in Tacoma. Brau received an appointment from Rep. Thor Tollefson to the United States Air Force Academy (USAFA), where he double-majored in physics and mathematics, earning a Bachelor of Science in 1969. He earned a Scientiæ Magister degree in physics in 1970 at the Massachusetts Institute of Technology (MIT) working with advisor Irwin A. Pless.

While in the Air Force he took graduate classes at the University of New Mexico in 1972–1973. Based on data collected at the Fermi National Accelerator Laboratory with research advisor Richard K. Yamamoto, in January 1978 he earned a Doctor of Philosophy degree in physics at MIT. He was supported by a Fannie and John Hertz Foundation Fellowship from 1969 to 1970 and 1974–77.

Brau married in 1969 and has two adult sons and four grandchildren.

Career and research 

Brau served in the Guidance Test Directorate at Holloman Air Force Base in 1970–1971, and in the Theoretical Branch of the Air Force Weapons Laboratory at Kirtland Air Force Base during 1971–1974, working with Gregory Canavan. At Kirtland Brau carried out theoretical studies of laser-target interactions, electromagnetic pulse, and charged particle beams. He served as chief of the General Physics Group in 1973–1974, and resigned his Air Force commission in 1974 as a captain.

He was a research associate at the Stanford Linear Accelerator Center (SLAC) in the bubble chamber experimental research group from 1978 to 1982. There he was responsible for the hybrid bubble chamber facility's lead glass detector, in collaboration with colleagues from Duke University, Florida State University and the University of Tennessee. On the physics faculty at the University of Tennessee from 1982 to 1988, he continued investigations of photoproduction of charmed particles and vector mesons at SLAC. He joined the SLD Collaboration, beginning preparations for an experiment at the SLAC Linear Collider. He studied the design of a uranium calorimeter for SLD and in 1985 published an analysis in collaboration with Tony A. Gabriel — the first to show that despite earlier experimental work, compensation cannot be achieved with liquid argon readout. Using Monte Carlo calculations, Brau and Gabriel showed the importance of low energy neutron interactions with the readout medium hydrogen to achieve compensation.

Brau joined the physics faculty at the University of Oregon in 1988, establishing the first Oregon experimental particle physics group to collaborate with Oregon's existing particle theory group. During early years at Oregon, Brau's research continued to be based on the SLAC Linear Collider where he collaborated on the SLD experiment. He led the design, construction and operation of an innovative silicon-tungsten electromagnetic calorimeter luminosity monitor. During the active period of the Superconducting Supercollider (SSC) Brau joined the GEM detector project. When the SSC was terminated in 1993, he was appointed project manager for the SLD vertex detector upgrade at SLAC, and led the project which produced a 307,000,000 pixel CCD vertex detector for SLD.

The University of Oregon established the Center for High Energy Physics in 1997, with Brau as founding director. The Center sponsors seminars, visiting scientists, interactions between theoretical and experimental physicists, and also supports graduate students.

Brau led the Oregon group into the Laser Interferometer Gravitational-Wave Observatory (LIGO) Scientific Collaboration in 1997; he was a co-author of the 2016 gravitational wave discovery paper. 

Brau's research group participated in the NuTeV experiment at Fermilab and BaBar at PEP-II at SLAC before applying to join the ATLAS experiment at the Large Hadron Collider (LHC) in 2005. Brau leads the UO group of faculty, postdoctoral researchers and graduate students at the LHC; in 2012 he was a co-author of the ATLAS Higgs boson discovery paper.

The UO experimental group has grown to include approximately 30 researchers, including five faculty, as well as post-doctoral students, graduate students and undergraduates. The group has been supported since 1988 by a total of more than US$30 million in grants from the U.S. Department of Energy and the National Science Foundation.

Brau has served on numerous advisory panels and review committees, including the Department of Energy High Energy Physics Advisory Panel (HEPAP) from 2005 to 2008; the HEPAP Particle Physics Project Prioritization Panel, from 2007 to 2011; chair, SLAC Scientific Policy Committee from 2001 to 2004; Fermilab Physics Advisory Committee from 2002 to 2006; Deutsches Elektronen-Synchrotron Physics Review Committee from 2003 to 2007; the International Advisory Board, Physics at the Terascale, Strategic Helmholtz Alliance, Germany, since 2007; and the International Advisory Committee, International Conference on Calorimetry in Particle Physics, since 2013. 

Brau co-chaired the organizing committee of the World-wide Study of the Physics and Detectors for Future Linear electron-positron Colliders from 2002 to 2014. He has been a leader in the worldwide collaboration to design and build the International Linear Collider. In December 2016 Brau was named "Associate Director for Physics and Detectors" of the Linear Collider Collaboration, effective January 2017.

Ph.D. graduates advised 

 Kevin Pitts, 1994, Electroweak Coupling Measurements from Polarized Bhabha Scattering at the Z0 Resonance, SLAC-R-446.
 Hyun Huang, 1994, QCD Test in Three-jet Z0 Decays at SLD and Detector Development for H → gamma gamma Searches in High Energy Colliders, SLAC-R-453.
 Matthew Langston, 2003, A Measurement of the Effective Electron Neutral Current Coupling Parameters from Polarized Bhabha Scattering at the Z0 Resonance, SLAC-R-629.
 Sean Walston, 2004, Heavy Flavor Decays of the Z0 and a Search for Flavor Changing Neutral Currents. SLAC-R-728.
 Masahiro Ito, 2006, Search for supernova induced gravitational wave bursts with optimal filter technique on LIGO science data.
 Jan Strube, 2008, Analysis of radiative decays of charged B mesons to baryonic final states.
 Jacob Searcy, 2012, Measurement of the top quark pair production cross section in p - p collisions at a center-of-mass energy of 7 TeV in the lepton + tau channel with ATLAS.
 Elizabeth Brost, 2016, Search for the Flavor-Changing Neutral Current in Top Pair Events in sqrt(s) = 8 TeV Proton-Proton Collisions at the Large Hadron Collider Using the ATLAS Detector.
 Chaowaroj Wanotayaroj, 2016, Search for a Scalar Partner of the Top Quark in the Jets+ETMiss Final State with the ATLAS detector.
 Jason Barkeloo, 2020, Search for the Flavor-Changing Neutral Current, t->q gamma, in Top Pair Events Using the Atlas Detector.
 Amanda Steinhebel, 2021, Much Ado About Nothing: Searches for Higgs Boson Decays to Invisible Particles.

Honors and awards 
Upon graduation from USAFA, Brau received the award as Outstanding Cadet in Physics of the Class of 1969. He was a Hertz Foundation Fellow for the duration of his graduate work at MIT.

In 2000, Brau was elected a Fellow of the American Physical Society, for "contributions to the development of particle detectors, particularly calorimeters and vertex detectors, and for studies of the properties of the Z boson with the SLD".

Brau is a senior member of the Institute of Electrical and Electronics Engineers.

At the University of Oregon in 2006, Brau was named Philip H. Knight Professor of Natural Science, an endowed position funded by Oregon alumnus Philip H. Knight.

In 2009 he was elected a Fellow of the American Association for the Advancement of Science, for "distinguished contributions to the field of elementary particle physics, particularly for developing and applying new technologies to facilitate precision tests of the Standard Model".

In 2011, Brau received the University of Oregon Research Innovation Award. In 2012, he was chosen to deliver the Inaugural Presidential Research Lecture at the University of Oregon.

References

External links 
 
 Oral history interview transcript with James Brau on 11 May 2021, American Institute of Physics, Niels Bohr & Archives
 Einstein's Warped Universe: Riding Gravitational Waves through Space-Time (video, 1:22:56 hours)
 The Higgs-Boson: Window on the Big Bang (video, 1:23:47 hours) (UO Presidential research lecture)
 I want the ILC! by Jim Brau (video, 1:22 minutes)
 Recent Discoveries on the Frontiers of Science (mp4 video, 59 minutes)
 Two Minutes of Darkness: Dr. Jim Brau on the Total Eclipse (audio, 5:29 minutes)

1946 births
21st-century American physicists
Educators from Washington (state)
Fellows of the American Association for the Advancement of Science
Fellows of the American Physical Society
Living people
MIT Department of Physics alumni
Senior Members of the IEEE
United States Air Force Academy alumni
University of Oregon faculty
University of Tennessee faculty